Gerges is a surname. Notable people with the surname include: 

 Carl Gerges (born 1987), Lebanese musician and architect
 Hesdy Gerges (born 1984), Egyptian-Dutch kickboxer
 Fawaz Gerges (born 1958), Lebanese-American academic and author
 Patrice Gerges (born 1966), French paralympic athlete